Andrew Marvel (or Andrew Marvell) was launched at Hull in 1812. From 1812 to 1835 she was a Greenland whaler, hunting bowhead whales in the northern whale fishery. Thereafter she became a merchantman. She foundered in September 1843 while on a voyage from Hull to Saint John, New Brunswick.

Greenland whaler
Thomas Richardson built Andrew Marvel on the lines of the whaler Isabella that he had built in 1786.

Andrew Marvell first appeared in Lloyd's Register (LR) in 1812 with T. Orton, master, Marshall, owner, and trade Hull–Davis Strait. 

The following data are primarily from Coltish:

In 1819, a record 65 whalers sailed from Hull. Andrew Marvel sold for £7,800, complete, but net of outfitting for the coming season. She was the first whaler to return; she had left the ice on 8 July and arrived back at Hull on 12 August.

Merchantman
LR for 1836 showed Andrew Marvel with M. Wright, master, Hopwood, owner, and trade Hull–Davis Strait, changing to Hull–America. She had had a thorough repair in 1836.

Fate
On 25 September 1843 Andrew Marvel was in a sinking state at  when Lotus came on the scene and rescued the crew. Andrew Marvel had been sailing from Hull to Saint John. LR for 1844 carried the annotation "Lost" by her name.

Citations

References
 
 
 
 

1812 ships
Ships built in Kingston upon Hull
Age of Sail merchant ships of England
Whaling ships
Maritime incidents in September 1843